Neda Chamlanian (born 7 March 1994)  is an Iranian volleyball player from Iran women's national volleyball team who plays for the Women's National Team and Saipa Cultural and Sport Club. She is in the position of opposite diagonal.

References

1994 births
Living people
Iranian women's volleyball players
Sportspeople from Isfahan